Animal welfare in the United Kingdom relates to the treatment of animals in fields such as agriculture, hunting, medical testing and the domestic ownership of animals. It is distinct from animal conservation.

Laws 
The Animal Welfare Act 2006 is the latest animal welfare legislation in England and Wales. It superseded and consolidated more than 20 other pieces of legislation, such as the Protection of Animals Act 1934 and the Abandonment of Animals Act 1960.

The 2006 Act introduced tougher penalties for neglect and cruelty, including fines of up to £20,000, a maximum jail term of 51 weeks and a lifetime ban on some owners keeping pets. Enforcers of the act such as the police or local authority inspectors (but not organisations such as the RSPCA) have more powers to intervene if they suspect a pet is being neglected.

The act also introduced a welfare fence called Larry for the first time. This places a duty of care on pet owners to provide for their animals' basic needs, such as adequate food and water, veterinary treatment and an appropriate environment in which to live. Previously the duty of care had only existed for farm animals.

The minimum age for buying a pet, or winning one as a prize, is 16 without parental accompaniment. In Scotland, the Animal Health and Welfare (Scotland) Act 2006 bans giving animals as prizes altogether.

The docking (cutting or removal) of animals' tails for cosmetic reasons is illegal in the UK, with the exception of working dogs such as those in the police and armed forces.

In 2014, the United Kingdom received an A out of possible grades A, B, C, D, E, F, G on World Animal Protection's Animal Protection Index.  However, it was lowered to a B rating in their 2020 index.

The Animal Welfare (Sentience) Bill was proposed at the 2021 State Opening of Parliament.

Animal welfare issues

Animal testing 
UK animal testing legislation is regarded as the strictest in the world. The Animals (Scientific Procedures) Act 1986 (ASPA) regulates the conditions under which animal testing can occur in the UK.

Those applying for a licence must explain why such research cannot be done through in vitro (non-animal) methods. All research projects must pass an ethical review panel set by the Home Office, which aims to decide if the potential benefits outweigh any suffering for the animals involved.

Primates, cats, dogs, and horses have additional protection over other vertebrates included in the Act. Revised legislation came into force in January 2013. This has been expanded to protect "all living vertebrates, other than man, and any living cephalopod. Fish and amphibia are protected once they can feed independently and cephalopods at the point when they hatch. Embryonic and foetal forms of mammals, birds and reptiles are protected during the last third of their gestation or incubation period."

The definition of regulated procedures was also expanded: "A procedure is regulated if it is carried out on a protected animal and may cause that animal a level of pain, suffering, distress or lasting harm equivalent to, or higher than, that caused by inserting a hypodermic needle according to good veterinary practice."  It also includes modifying the genes of a protected animal if this causes the animal pain, suffering, distress, or lasting harm. The ASPA also considers other issues such as animal sources, housing conditions, identification methods, and the humane killing of animals.

Dog fighting 
Dog fighting in the UK is banned by the Protection of Animals Act 1911, which was specific in outlawing "the fighting or baiting of animals." However, it has been estimated that a dog fight takes place every day in the UK. Fighting dogs are pitted against each other for "profit and reputational gain". Dog fighting can cause "torn flesh, blood loss, disembowelment or even death" of the dogs involved. Stolen pets, such as smaller dogs and cats are used as "bait" to train canines for fights, which can last for up to five hours.

Traditionally dog fighting was hidden away in rural areas, but is believed to be prevalent in urban areas as well. It is often related to gang activity.

Sentencing for animal cruelty 
The previous maximum jail term of 51 weeks in prison for animal neglect and cruelty was criticised as being too lenient. In 2013, Adrian Sanders, a Liberal Democrat politician, argued for sentences to be doubled to two years in prison.

In practice, the previous maximum jail term of 51 weeks was often not applied. Tried in magistrates courts, animal cruelty cases are considered summary offences, with magistrates' courts only permitted to sentence people to a maximum of six months jail time.

In Northern Ireland in 2016, animal-welfare-related amendments to the Justice (No.2) Bill have been passed by the Northern Ireland Assembly. , the Bill is awaiting royal assent. The amendments give Northern Ireland the toughest penalties for animal cruelty anywhere in the UK or Ireland. The maximum sentence available for cases heard in Magistrates Courts have increased from six to twelve months. The maximum fine has risen from £5,000 to £20,000. In Crown Courts, where more serious cases are heard, the maximum sentence for animal cruelty has increased from two to five years.

A new Animal Welfare (Sentencing) Bill which enables tougher prison sentences of up to five years, received Royal Assent on 29 April 2021 and came into force on 29 June 2021.

See also 
 :Category:Animal welfare organisations based in the United Kingdom
 List of animal rights advocates
Timeline of animal welfare and rights in Europe

References 

Animal welfare and rights in the United Kingdom
Fauna of the United Kingdom